Borza is a surname. Notable people with the surname include:

Adrian Borza (born 1985), Romanian footballer
Bogdan Borza (born 1997), Romanian tennis player
Kristy Borza (born 1986), American sports coach
Lucia Borza, folklorist 
Eugene N. Borza, American history professor
Alexandru Borza (1887–1971), Romanian botanist

Romanian-language surnames